The 33rd Annual Annie Awards were held on February 4, 2006, at the Alex Theatre in Glendale, California, hosted by Tom Kenny. The ceremony was for the first time recorded for television.

Winners and Nominees
Nominations announced on December 5, 2005. Winners are highlighted in boldface.

Best Animated Feature
 Wallace & Gromit: The Curse of the Were-Rabbit
 Chicken Little
 Corpse Bride
 Howl's Moving Castle
 Madagascar

Best Home Entertainment Production
 Lilo & Stitch 2: Stitch Has a Glitch
 Bionicle 3: Web of Shadows
 Kronk's New Groove
 Tarzan II
 The Batman vs. Dracula

Best Animated Short Subject
 The Fan and the Flower
 Life in Transition
 Milch
 Moongirl
 The Moon and the Son: An Imagined Conversation

Best Animated Television Commercial
 United Airlines - "Mr. Pants" ConocoPhillips - "1975"
 They Might Be Giants - "Bastard Wants to Hit Me"
 Coke - "Futbol"
 GE - "Tower"

Best Animated Television Production
 Star Wars: Clone Wars Avatar: The Last Airbender Foster's Home for Imaginary Friends My Life as a Teenage Robot The BatmanBest Animated Video Game
 Ultimate Spider-Man Psychonauts Resident Evil 4 SpongeBob SquarePants: Lights, Camera, Pants! Tak: The Great Juju Challenge''

References

External links
 33rd Annual Annie Nominations and Awards Recipients

2005
Glendale, California
2006 film awards
Annie
Annie